Stanhopea embreei is a species of orchid.

The classification of this species was published by Calaway H. Dodson in Selbyana, 1: 128. 1975. The original isotype was collected by Dodson.

Distribution: Cañar (Ecuador, Western South America, Southern America).

The holotype is kept at Systematic Entomology Laboratory (SEL).

Etymology: This species is named for Alvin Embree, an American orchidologist.

Molecular analysis by Whitten al. revealed the major chemical component of this species fragrance is trans-methyl cinnamate.

Closely related species are Stanhopea frymirei  & Stanhopea jenischiana based on molecular data.

Gallery

References 

 Norris H. Williams & W. Mark Whitten, Molecular phylogeny and floral fragrances of male euglossine bee-pollinated orchids: A study of Stanhopea (Orchidaceae). Plant Species Biology (1999) 14, 129-136.

External links 

embreei
Orchids of Ecuador
Cañar Province